Monte Sagro is a mountain in the Alpi Apuane, in Tuscany, central Italy, overlooking the city of Carrara.

It is located in the northern part of the range, and, being mostly composed of marble of renowned quality, is home to several quarries. The name (meaning "holy") identifies it as  a sacred place for the ancient Liguri tribe, together with the Monte Bego at the modern boundary between France and Italy.

Mountains of Tuscany
Mountains of the Apennines